Steven Jay Tasker (born April 10, 1962) is a former American football wide receiver and gunner and current sports reporter. He was drafted in the ninth round (226th overall) of the 1985 NFL Draft by the Houston Oilers. He played college football at Northwestern. He began his college career at Dodge City Community College.  Tasker played most of his pro career with the Buffalo Bills, and was voted by Bills fans to the team's 50th season All-time Team.  

Since his retirement, he has worked as a reporter, currently serving locally in Western New York on the MSG Western New York cable TV station, and on WGR Radio and formerly for CBS Sports.

In 2008, the NFL Network show NFL Top 10 ranked Tasker the ninth best former player not enshrined in the Pro Football Hall of Fame.  He has several times been a nominee for the Hall, making the semi-finalist list eight times, but has not been selected as a member as of 2023.

College career
Tasker first attended Dodge City Community College. After two years, he transferred to Northwestern University where he played the final two years of his college career before joining the National Football League.  Tasker finished his college career with 1,055 combined return yards from punts and kickoffs, averaging 10.8 yards per punt return. After finishing his college football career, and before being drafted into the NFL, he joined the school's rugby team. Although he had never played rugby before, he was named most valuable player at the Big Ten Conference Tournament. Tasker continues to hold the Northwestern Wildcats football career record for kickoff return average (24.3).

Professional football career
Tasker was selected in the ninth round (226th overall) of the 1985 NFL Draft by the Houston Oilers where he played for two seasons. He was claimed off waivers by the Buffalo Bills on November 8, 1986.

Tasker was listed as a wide receiver, however, most of his playing time came as a gunner, on punts and kickoffs. After he joined the Buffalo Bills, he began to play at wide receiver more than with the Oilers. While he performed very well as a receiver when Buffalo needed his services there, the combination of excellent Bills depth at that position, his value as a special teams playmaker, and Tasker refusing to demand more playing time on offense kept his WR time very slight.

Still, Tasker did make contributions at the more traditional role on offense and special teams.  In a 1994 playoff game against the Los Angeles Raiders, he set up the Bills first touchdown with a 67-yard kickoff return.  He also caught 5 passes for 108 yards and a touchdown in Buffalo's 1995 playoff win against the Miami Dolphins.

Play as gunner
Tasker recalled, "I told him not to worry because I was mistaken for a ball boy all the time". Despite his small size, he gained a reputation as one of the league's most feared hitters, forcing numerous fumbles. Contributing to his success in breaking up kick and punt returns was his speed; he was almost always the first player to reach the return man. He was the first player to establish himself as a star almost exclusively through special teams play without being either a kicker or a returner. Tasker played in seven Pro Bowls (1987 and 1990–1995) and became the only special teamer ever to be named the game's MVP in 1993.

 204 special teams tackles  
 7 Blocked Punts
 7-time Pro Bowl selection
 Only special Teams player ever elected Pro Bowl MVP
 Was voted one of 26 players by the Pro Football Hall of Fame in the year 2000 as "The Best of the Best ALL TIME Players in the History of the Game"

Many, including former teammate and Hall of Fame quarterback Jim Kelly, consider him to be the greatest special teams player of all-time and believe that he should be in the Hall of Fame. He was ranked No. 9 on the NFL Network's NFL Top 10 Players Not in the Hall of Fame.

Sportscasting career
Tasker was a color commentator for CBS football telecasts with Andrew Catalon (play-by-play) and Steve Beuerlein (the other color commentator) starting in 2014. CBS did not renew his contract at the end of the 2018 season. He also does color commentary for the local broadcasts of Bills pre-season games, teaming with either his former broadcast partner Andrew Catalon or Rob Stone. He is also the spokesperson for the West Herr Auto Group. Tasker was on the sidelines with Jim Nantz and Phil Simms during the playoffs until 2013. He also worked with Don Criqui (Criqui, himself a Buffalo native, and Tasker were assigned to the majority of Bills games from 1999 to 2005) and was best known working with Gus Johnson in 1998, week 13 in 1999, week 5 in 2004, and from 2005 to 2010. Johnson left for FOX Sports the following year. He and Johnson called the David Garrard game winning Hail Mary touchdown pass for the Jacksonville Jaguars' win over the Houston Texans in 2010. CBS dismissed Tasker prior to the 2019 season as they chose not to renew his contract.

On September 9, 2007, Tasker became the 24th person inducted to the Bills' Wall of Fame.

On November 22, 2011, Tasker was named one of the semifinalists in balloting for the Pro Football Hall of Fame in Canton, Ohio.

On September 28, 2013, his son, Luke Tasker, made his Canadian Football League debut with the Hamilton Tiger-Cats, in a home game against the Calgary Stampeders. Luke Tasker also became a broadcaster during and after his playing career, becoming the Tiger-Cats' color commentator.

In April 2018, Tasker became co-host of One Bills Live, a daily weekday radio show focusing on the Buffalo Bills alongside Chris Brown on WGR and MSG Western New York. He served as the color commentator and analyst for the Buffalo Bills Radio Network in 2020 alongside John Murphy after Eric Wood opted out of the season due to traveling difficulties associated with the coronavirus pandemic.

Personal life
Steve is married to his wife Sarah. They have five children, including Luke Tasker, and they reside in East Aurora, New York.

References

External links
 
 Buffalo Bills biography of Steve Tasker (archived from 1997)

1962 births
Living people
American football wide receivers
Buffalo Bills announcers
Buffalo Bills players
Dodge City Conquistadors football players
Houston Oilers players
National Football League announcers
Northwestern Wildcats football players
American Conference Pro Bowl players
Rugby union players that played in the NFL
People from Smith Center, Kansas
People from Wichita County, Kansas
Players of American football from Kansas
Ed Block Courage Award recipients